The 1896 Buffalo football team represented the University of Buffalo as an independent during the 1896 college football season. The team compiled an 9–1–2 record. Buffalo's coach was Fred D. Townsend and played its home games at Buffalo Athletic Field and Olympic Park in Buffalo, New York.

Schedule

References

Buffalo
Buffalo Bulls football seasons
Buffalo football